Futuroscope is a TGV railway station located near Poitiers, France. It is situated on the Paris–Bordeaux railway. It gives a direct access to the park Futuroscope. It opened on 28 May 2000.

References

External links 
 

Railway stations in Vienne
Railway stations in France opened in 2000